Saad El-Din Rafik Al-Hariri (born 18 April 1970) is a Lebanese-Saudi politician who served as the prime minister of Lebanon from 2009 to 2011 and 2016 to 2020. The son of Rafic Hariri, he founded and has been leading the Future Movement party since 2007. He is seen as "the strongest figurehead" of the March 14 Alliance.

Hariri served as Prime Minister of Lebanon from 9 November 2009 to 13 June 2011. After three years living overseas, he returned to Lebanon on 8 August 2014 and served a second term as Prime Minister from 18 December 2016 to 21 January 2020. Hariri's surprise announcement of an intent to resign, broadcast on 4 November 2017 on Saudi state TV, has widely been seen as part of the Iran–Saudi Arabia proxy conflict in Lebanon, and triggered a dispute between Lebanon and Saudi Arabia. The resignation was later suspended, following President Michel Aoun's request to "put it on hold ahead of further consultations". On October 29, 2019, amid the 2019–20 Lebanese protests, he announced his resignation, and that of his cabinet. He was designated as prime minister on 22 October 2020, but failed to form a government and resigned on 15 July 2021.

On January 24, 2022, he announced that he will suspend his involvement in political activities and did not run in the parliamentary elections on May 15, 2022.

Early years 
Saad Hariri was born in Riyadh, Saudi Arabia on 18 April 1970, and is the son of Rafic Hariri and his first wife Nidal Bustani, an Iraqi woman from the city of Mosul. In addition to his native Arabic, Hariri speaks English, French and Italian. He graduated in 1992 from the McDonough School of Business at Georgetown University with a degree in business administration.

Business activities

Prior to entering politics, Hariri was the chairman of the executive committee of Oger Telecom, which pursued telecommunication interests in the Middle East and Africa, from 1994 to 2005. In addition, Hariri was the chairman of Omnia Holdings and a board member of Oger International Entreprise de Travaux Internationaux, Saudi Oger, Saudi Investment Bank, Saudi Research and Marketing Group and Lebanese television channel Future TV.

Political career

On 20 April 2005, the Hariri family announced that Saad Hariri would lead the Future Movement, an essentially Sunni movement that was created and led by his late father. He was the leader of the March 14 Alliance, a coalition of political groups born out of the Cedar Revolution which, through mass popular demonstrations and Western support, led to the withdrawal of Syrian troops from Lebanon in 2005 after a 29-year presence.

First tenure and collapse
Hariri was first elected prime minister from 9 November 2009 until 13 June 2011.

On 12 January 2011, minutes after Hariri posed for pictures with President Barack Obama in the Oval Office, the opposition parties resigned from his unity government cabinet, causing its collapse. The withdrawal of Hezbollah and its allies was due to political tensions arising from investigations into the assassination of Rafic Hariri. Hezbollah operatives had been accused of assassinating Rafic Hariri.

Hariri continued on for four months as caretaker Prime Minister. The new Lebanese government was formed on 13 June 2011 and headed by Najib Mikati. Mikati created an 8 March-led government coalition.

Syrian arrest warrant
On 12 December 2012, Syria issued a warrant for the arrest of Hariri, Future bloc deputy Okab Sakr and Free Syrian Army official Louay Almokdad on charges of arming and providing financial support for Syrian opposition groups. Hariri released a statement in response, describing Bashar al-Assad as a "monster".

Second tenure
Following more than two years of deadlock in electing a president, Michel Aoun was elected. Shortly after, Aoun signed a decree appointing Hariri as prime minister for the second time and he took office on 18 December 2016.

Dispute with Saudi Arabia

On 4 November 2017, in a televised statement from Saudi Arabia, Hariri tendered his resignation from office, citing Iran's and Hezbollah's political over-extension in the Middle East region and fears of assassination. Iran vehemently rejected Saad Hariri's remarks and called his resignation part of a plot by the United States, Israel, and Saudi Arabia to heighten Middle Eastern tensions. The Lebanese Army responded with a statement that intelligence in its possession in addition to ongoing arrests and investigations had not revealed "the presence of any plan for assassinations in the country."

Most Iran-leaning or Shia-aligned Lebanese groups, including Hezbollah, were among the first to accuse Saudi Arabia of holding Hariri hostage; Hariri's associates and Saudi officials subsequently denied this. Several Lebanese commentators poked fun at the released pictures of Hariri in Saudi Arabia for their apparent similarity to those taken of hostages. Anti-Hezbollah blogger Michael Young stated that he did not think Hariri was an actual hostage of the Saudi regime, but that the situation confirmed Hariri's close ties with them. However, Lebanese-American political scientist As'ad AbuKhalil claimed that the Saudis had jailed and physically restrained and assaulted Hariri before ordering him to broadcast his resignation. In November, it was announced that Hariri was on his way from Saudi Arabia to the United Arab Emirates. Hariri's own party's media outlet reported that he would then move on to Bahrain and later back to Beirut, but both of these trips were subsequently cancelled and he was sent back to Riyadh. Hariri's allies, who usually aligned with Saudi Arabia, then joined the other parties in their concern for Hariri's freedom being limited by Saudi Arabia. The majority of the Lebanese government requested his return. On 11 November, Lebanese President Michel Aoun released the statement: "Lebanon does not accept its prime minister being in a situation at odds with international treaties and the standard rules in relations between states."

Later in November, Hariri left for France to meet French President Emmanuel Macron. Macron specifically requested he take his wife and children along with him. He was able to make such a request due to Hariri's French citizenship. Hariri declared in Beirut on 21 November that he had suspended his resignation. He stated that President Michel Aoun had asked him to "put it on hold ahead of further consultations". He refused to talk about what happened in Saudi Arabia and claimed that events will remain undisclosed. He rescinded his resignation on 5 December and stated that all members of the government had agreed to stay out of conflicts in Arab countries.

2019 protests and resignation
In mid-October 2019, a popular protest movement began calling for increased accountability and transparency in politics. His government was widely viewed as corrupt by the Lebanese people. On 29 October, Hariri offered his resignation as a concession, saying "This is in response to the will and demand of the thousands of Lebanese demanding change". The following day, President Michel Aoun accepted the resignation but requested that Hariri remain in office till a successor was appointed. Hassan Diab, the former education minister, was appointed to the role on 21 January 2020. On 10 August 2020, Diab resigned in the aftermath of the Beirut explosion due to mounting political pressure and anger at the Lebanese government for their failure to prevent the disaster, exacerbated by existing political tensions and upheavals within the country.

2020 designation 
After the resignation of Diab, Hariri and the Prime Ministers' club favored the Lebanese ambassador to Germany Mustapha Adib to be the next Prime Minister. Although he was appointed after being nominated by 90 of 120 MPs on 30 August, he stepped down three weeks later after failing to form a new cabinet.

On 8 October, Hariri announced in an interview that he is "definitely a candidate" for the position, and called other political parties not to waste what is called the "French Initiative". On 22 October, Saad Hariri was reappointed as Prime Minister. He was backed by his Future Movement, PSP and Amal Movement, receiving 65 votes, 4 less than his predecessor Diab, while Hezbollah along with major Christian parties, Free Patriotic Movement and Lebanese Forces, did not endorse him.

After  days and 18 meetings with Aoun, he has yet failed to form a government. He met with Recep Tayyip Erdoğan in Turkey in January 2021, Abdel Fattah el-Sisi in Egypt in February, and visited Mohammed bin Zayed in United Arab Emirates several times. Hariri has been criticized for spending a great amount of time outside Lebanon, while the absence of a government worsened the financial crisis in the country, and his trips were seen as an attempt to compensate the support he lacked from Saudi Arabia.

On 16 March, the exchange rate reached 15,000 Lebanese pounds to the dollar. The next day, Aoun called Hariri to meet him. After the meeting, Hariri announced that the government could be formed soon. However, on 29 March, he claimed that Aoun proposed a formation that included the blocking third for FPM, which he rejected, and released another formation consisting of 18 ministers to the media. On 15 July, he decided to step down from his designation.

2022 political step-down 
On 24 January 2022 Hariri announced his withdrawal from Lebanese Politics and that he would not run in the 2022 general elections. He also called on the Future Movement to follow suit and not run in the upcoming parliamentary elections nor nominate anyone to run on its behalf.

Personal life
Saad Hariri born in 1970 in Riyadh is the second son of Lebanese Prime Minister Rafic Hariri and his first wife Nidal Bustani, an Iraqi. He has an older brother Bahaa Hariri (born 1967) and another brother Houssam Hariri who died young in a traffic accident. After his parents divorced, his father married Nazik Hariri (née Audi) in 1976. Saad Hariri has two half-brothers and one half-sister from his father's second marriage: Ayman Hariri, (born 1978), Fahd Hariri, (born c. 1980/81) and Hind Hariri, a sister (born 1984).

Hariri holds multiple citizenships: Lebanese, Saudi Arabian and French. He married Lara Al Azem in 1998, the daughter of Bashir Al Azem, an influential and wealthy Syrian construction magnate. They have three children: Houssam (born 1999), Loulwa (born 2001), and Abdulaziz (born 2005).

In 2007, French president Jacques Chirac awarded Saad Hariri the Légion d'honneur, a French order of merit.

Hariri lived in Paris from 2011 to 2014 for safety reasons, and returned to Lebanon on 8 August 2014.

In 2011, he was said to have a net worth of $2 billion. As of May 2018, his net worth is estimated to be $1.36 billion.

In 2013, Hariri allegedly paid South African bikini model,  Candice van der Merwe, a $16 million cash gift after meeting her in the Seychelles. In 2019, South African courts sued van der Merwe for failing to pay income taxes on the amount, despite her claims that it was a gift.

See also
Lebanese people in Saudi Arabia
Lebanese people in France
List of political families in Lebanon

Notes

References

External links
 
Future Movement's Official Site

To Live and Die in Beirut, A portfolio of Saad Hariri

|-

|-

1970 births
Living people
French Sunni Muslims
Saudi Arabian Sunni Muslims
American University of Beirut trustees
Chevaliers of the Légion d'honneur
Children of national leaders
Future Movement politicians
McDonough School of Business alumni
Saad
Lebanese billionaires
Lebanese emigrants to Saudi Arabia
Lebanese people of Iraqi descent
Naturalized citizens of France
Members of the Parliament of Lebanon
Prime Ministers of Lebanon
Atlantic Council
Saudi Arabian people of Iraqi descent
Heads of government who were later imprisoned
French people of Lebanese descent
French people of Iraqi descent
People expelled from public office
21st-century Lebanese politicians